The Denis Rankin Round is a long distance hill running challenge around the Mourne Mountains in County Down, Northern Ireland. The route is a circuit of over 90 kilometres, with a total climb of over 6,500 metres.  The Round must be completed within 24 hours to be considered a success.

The record times are 13:20 by Shane Lynch and 19:12 by Aoife Mundow.

The route 

Much of the route runs through the Mourne Mountains Area of Outstanding Natural Beauty; the highest summit in both Ulster and Northern Ireland (Slieve Donard) is included.  The Round must be completed either in the order below, or in the reverse order.

See also
Wicklow Round

References

External links 
 Official Site: Denis Rankin Round

Fell running challenges
Challenge walks
Peak bagging in the United Kingdom
Mountains and hills of Ireland
Mountains and hills of the United Kingdom
Mountains and hills of Northern Ireland
Mountains and hills of County Down
Peak bagging in Ireland